Ignacio Jorge Sanabria (born 29 December 1989) is an Argentine professional footballer who plays as a left-back for Gimnasia y Tiro.

Career
Sanabria's senior career began with Gimnasia y Esgrima, appearing on the substitutes bench in September 2010 for a Primera B Nacional fixture with Tiro Federal. His professional debut arrived in the following June against CAI, as he was subbed on for the final three minutes of a 4–2 victory at the Estadio 23 de Agosto. He made one hundred and nineteen appearances in nine seasons with Gimnasia y Esgrima. In his tenth campaign, Sanabria scored his first senior goal during an away draw versus Sarmiento on 1 December 2018.

Personal life
In May 2014, Sanabria failed a drug test after a Primera B Nacional match against San Martín on 19 April due to benzoylecgonine traces found in his urine sample. He was suspended by the AFA for three months.

Career statistics
.

References

External links

1989 births
Living people
Sportspeople from Jujuy Province
Argentine footballers
Association football defenders
Doping cases in association football
Argentine sportspeople in doping cases
Primera Nacional players
Gimnasia y Esgrima de Jujuy footballers
Club Atlético Brown footballers
Gimnasia y Tiro footballers